Acacia fimbriata, commonly known as the fringed wattle or Brisbane golden wattle, is a species of Acacia that is native along much of the east coast of Australia.

Description
It has angled or flattened branchlets and linear phyllodes with a  narrowly elliptic or narrowly lanceolate shape and are straight or very slightly curved.

The glabrous, firmly paper seed pods that form after flowering are flat and straight to slightly curved with straight sides.

Taxonomy
Acacia fimbriata was first formally described by the botanist George Don in 1832 in his book A General History of Dichlamydeous Plants from an unpublished manuscript by Allan Cunningham. The type specimen was collected by Cunningham in 1828 from along the Brisbane River.

Distribution
The shrub is commonly situated in coastal areas and the adjacent tablelands in New South Wales and Queensland. In New South Wales it is found from Nerriga in the south to Inverell in the west to north of the Queensland border as far as Yeppoon and the Carnarvon National Park. It is often located along rocky streams as a part of Eucalyptus woodland communities growing in rocky and sandy soils or along the fringes of rainforest in more northern areas.

Cultivation
The plant is available for cultivation in seed form. It can be gown as a hedge or screening plant but does require adequate water. It is quite hardy, can be planted in a tropical environment and is frost tolerant.

See also

List of Acacia species

References

fimbriata
Flora of New South Wales
Flora of Queensland
Fabales of Australia
Trees of Australia
Plants described in 1832
Taxa named by George Don
Taxa named by Allan Cunningham (botanist)